Racing Calendar is the horseracing official publication of the Jockey Club. John Cheny (fl.1727-1750) published the first calendar in 1727, titled An Historical List of Horse-Matches Run, and maintained annual publication until 1750.  Several calendars appeared, by various publishers.

In 1773 the periodical was taken over and published by James Weatherby, who in 1770 had been appointed as Keeper of the Match Book for the Jockey Club.  Weatherbys continued to own and publish the calendar until 1902 when the Jockey Club finally purchased it.

References

Horse racing mass media in the United Kingdom
Jockey Club
Equine magazines